{{DISPLAYTITLE:C15H10O8}}
The molecular formula C15H10O8 (molar mass : 318.23 g/mol, exact mass 318.037567) may refer to:
 Gossypetin, a flavonol
 Myricetin, a flavonol
 Quercetagetin, a flavonol.